Citizen Matters is an independent news media outlet with a focus on cities and citizens by reporting on critical issues, ideas and solutions to India’s urban issues. Citizen Matters is published by Oorvani Foundation, a Bangalore-registered trust setup in 2013 to develop and promote journalism on governance, citizenship and society in India at the city, state and national levels.

History 
Citizen Matters was founded in Bengaluru in 2008 by Meera K and Subramaniam Vincent. The idea for Citizen Matters emerged after the duo felt that while there existed many local newspapers and online news media outlets, there was no English local news outlet dedicated to reportage of civic issues from Bengaluru. This prompted them to start the website focussed on news from Bengaluru from the citizens' perspective. In 2009, a few months after the launch of Citizen Matters - the website, a fortnightly magazine was launched. It was one of the first websites that ventured into print owing to the demands from their readers.   Back then, it was Bengaluru’s first online community e-newsmagazine. The print edition of Citizen Matters ran from 2009 to 2012.

About the founders 
Meera K is the founder-editor of Citizen Matters. She has been an ICFJ Knight fellow and also been an Ashoka fellow.  Subramaniam Vincent is currently the director of the Journalism and Media Ethics program at the Santa Clara University. He was also the 2016 John S Knight fellow at Stanford University. He is no longer involved in the day-to-day functioning of the website.

Funding 
When Citizen Matters was started, initial funding for the website came from the founders and a few donors. They also started selling guidebooks. The first one was 'Living in Bengaluru' guidebook consisting of step-by-step guides for essential procedures like getting birth and death certificates, driving licenses, passports, using BMTC bus services, knowing traffic fines, getting property papers, living in apartments, voter registration, getting water and electricity connections, filing FIRs, selecting school boards among others. 
Other books include a property guidebook and Getting to know Bengaluru, an insider’s guide to the city.

However, they ceased publication of physical books by 2014. Their attempts at raising funds from angel investors and venture capitalists did not materialise. They choose the non-profit route and set up Oorvani Foundation in August 2013 to run and manage the Citizen Matters website through grants and donations. Inspired by the National Public Radio model in the U.S., they launched annual drives to solicit funds from readers to fund the news website. They have also received grants from organisations viz. Rohini Nilekani foundation, Daksh among others.

Citizen Journalism 
Citizen Matters uses a hybrid model of contributions from professional journalists combined with citizen-generated content. More than a third of their content comes from citizens. They have a small in-house staff consisting of editors, staff reporters and community anchors that edit and vet articles. Each piece is edited and sent back to the citizen journalist before getting published. Examples involving citizens in their journalism include stories about the city's master plan whereby a citizen cross-checked the Bengaluru masterplan’s map of the area where he lived and found that it showed a road that did not exist. They have also used stories by citizens on issues related to road widening, solid waste management among other things.

Coverage 
Apart from common urban topics, the website has city-specific coverage for Bengaluru, Chennai and Mumbai. The Mumbai edition was launched around mid-2020.  
Citizen Matters publishes reports, data stories, analyses, commentaries as well as explainers. Topics include civic issues, local governance, water supply, waste management, transport and mobility, schooling, and health. 
Many articles have also been republished by other media like The News Minute and First Post.

Awards 
Citizen Matters has received several awards for their journalistic work. It was declared the joint winner of the Manthan Award (South Asia and Asia Pacific), instituted by the Digital Empowerment Foundation, in the e-News & Journalism category. Citizen Matters has also received the Manthan Award South West India, instituted by the Digital Empowerment Foundation, in the e-News & Journalism category, for creating an online resource of news and independent coverage. Their journalists have also won several awards for their work.

References 

Citizen journalism
Indian news websites
Ashoka India Fellows